State Road 569 (SR 569) is a short state road located entirely in Tampa, Florida.

The I-4/Crosstown Connector parallels this state route for most of its length.

Route description 
With 6 lanes, the northern terminus is with an intersection of US 41/SR 599. Formerly, SR 569 had an interchange with Interstate 4 (I-4) at exit 2, but later closed in 2005 due to I-4's widening project and the future I-4/Crosstown Connector.

South of I-4, the highway loses a lane in each direction and makes an S bend. It next intersects CR 574, an access road to Ybor City.  It then intersects the CSX Tampa Terminal Subdivision, and later reaches its southern terminus, State Road 60.

SR 569's previous southern terminus was with exit 10 of the Lee Roy Selmon Expressway (SR 618), which was immediately on the south side of SR 60, but closed May 13, 2010 due to construction of the I-4/Crosstown Connector.

Major intersections

References

External links

569
569